The 3rd constituency of Eure is a French legislative constituency in the Eure département.
It contains the cantons of Bernay, Beuzeville, Bourg-Achard and Pont-Audemer.

Deputies

Election Results

2022

 
 
 
 
 
 
|-
| colspan="8" bgcolor="#E9E9E9"|
|-

2017

2012

References

French legislative constituencies of Eure